Jumanji is a 1995 American fantasy adventure film about a supernatural board game, which makes wild animals and other jungle hazards materialize upon each player's move.

Jumanji may also refer to:

Jumanji (picture book), the 1981 fantasy children's picture book upon which the film is based
Jumanji (franchise), a media franchise developed from the eponymous children's book
Jumanji (TV series), an American animated television series based on the film
Jumanji: Welcome to the Jungle, a 2017 sequel to the original film
Jumanji: The Next Level, a 2019 sequel to Jumanji: Welcome to the Jungle
"Jumanji" (Azealia Banks song), a 2012 rap song
"Jumanji", a 2018 rap song by B Young

See also
 Zathura (disambiguation)
 Jumanji 2 (disambiguation)